Stumpffia is a genus of microhylid frogs that are endemic to Madagascar. They are mostly brown frogs that typically live among leaf litter.

The majority of the species have only been described since 2010. Each species has a small range and many are seriously threatened.

Taxonomy 
Stumpffia was first described from the single species Stumpffia psologlossa Boettger, 1881, based on a single specimen collected on Nosy Be, a large island off the northwest coast of Madagascar, by Anotonio Stumpff. By 2017, 15 species were recognised. In late 2017, a major revision of the genus was published. This study used integrative taxonomy, i.e. the combination of multiple different datasets, to delimit and describe new species: it combined morphological, morphometric, chromatic (color), bioacoustic (voice), and genetic data to provide new data on the 15 described species of Stumpffia, and describe a further 26 new species.

Debate on synonymy with Rhombophryne 
The genus Stumpffia was proposed to be a junior synonym of Rhombophryne in 2016, but this proposal was disputed and reversed by authors of a subsequent study, on the basis of their reciprocal monophyly and consistent morphological differences between the two genera that allow them to be distinguished. The latter study established a new genus, Anilany for "Stumpffia" helenae, a species that would otherwise have rendered Stumpffia paraphyletic, and which is morphologically and genetically highly distinct from any species of Rhombophryne or Stumpffia.

This debate was continued in 2017, with one group of authors continuing to advocate for synonymy of these two genera plus Anilany, while the other group of authors continued to advocate for separate treatment of these genera based on their monophyly and morphological distinction allowing them to be distinguished with comparative ease. There was a temporary impasse, wherein the Amphibian Species of the World database continued to adopt the single-genus taxonomy, and as a result, so too did the IUCN Red List of Endangered Species and other online databases (e.g. iNaturalist) that draw from that resource. Meanwhile, AmphibiaWeb continued to use the three-genus taxonomy, as did the taxonomists working on cophyline systematics, and other groups working more broadly on frog evolution and taxonomy.

In March 2019, a new genus, Mini, was described for the miniaturised frogs previously confused with Stumpffia that are more closely related to Plethodontohyla. Evidence in this study, as well as that presented in a paper by Na Tu et al. in 2018, helped to clarify the taxonomic situation, and the Amphibian Species of the World database reverted to treating Rhombophryne, Anilany, and Stumpffia as valid genera.

Species
There are over 40 currently recognised species:

The taxon Stumpffia helenae'''' Vallan, 2000 was transferred to Anilany'' and therefore does not appear on this list.

References

 
Cophylinae
Endemic frogs of Madagascar
Amphibian genera
Taxa named by Oskar Boettger